Sneham Oru Pravaaham is a 1981 Indian Malayalam film, directed by Dr. Shajahan. The film stars  Sukumaran, Vincent, Roopa, Jagathy Sreekumar and Silk Smitha in the lead roles. The film has musical score by K. J. Joy.

Cast
Jagathy Sreekumar
Sukumaran
Roopa
Silk Smitha
Vincent

Soundtrack
The music was composed by K. J. Joy and the lyrics was written by Dr. Shajahan.

References

External links
 

1981 films
1980s Malayalam-language films